Downtown is the central business district for Bakersfield, California. It contains several of the cities major theaters, sporting complexes, museums, and historical landmarks.

What is considered to be “downtown” Bakersfield varies. In order to define Downtown Bakersfield, it is important to first define the Central Bakersfield region. Starting from the north and traveling clockwise, Central Bakersfield is bounded by the Kern River, Union Avenue, State Route 58, and State Route 99. Most people (including the Downtown Business Association) define downtown Bakersfield as the region bordered by 24th Street (SR 178), Union Avenue (SR 204), California Avenue, and F Street. Other people extend the boundaries west to State Route 99 and north to Golden State Avenue (SR 204). Some people consider all of Central Bakersfield to be “downtown Bakersfield.”

Unlike many other cities of similar size, Bakersfield does not have a towering skyline. There are a few tall buildings in Downtown Bakersfield, such as the Bank of America Building (10 stories), the Bakersfield Marriott Hotel (9 stories), and The Padre Hotel (8 stories). The shops and cafes that line the Downtown streets feature a variety of dining and shopping venues. Notable attractions in Downtown Bakersfield include the Rabobank Arena, the McMurtrey Aquatic Center, the Bakersfield Museum of Art, the historic Fox Theater, the Padre Hotel, and a nightlife district centered on 19th Street and Wall Street Alley.

Districts
Bakersfield has always had some districts located downtown, but others are being created due to redevelopment efforts.

Arts District

The Arts District is one of the newer districts to be defined in Downtown Bakersfield. It is roughly bordered by 21st Street, Chester Avenue, 17th Street, and G Street. Theaters in the district include the Fox Theater (20th and H streets), Stars Theater (Chester Avenue and 20th Street) and Spotlight Theater (19th and H streets). In addition, several art galleries are located around the intersection of 19th Street and Eye Street. The Arts District is also home to the historic Padre Hotel, which has been remodeled and reopened as a boutique hotel. The district has also begun holding First Friday which showcases galleries and allows for street vendors on the first Friday of every month in support of local artists.

Civic Center

Civic Center is the center of government for both the City of Bakersfield and the County of Kern. It is roughly bordered by Truxtun Avenue, Q Street, the BNSF railroad yard, and H Street. Major government buildings include Bakersfield City Hall, County of Kern Administrative Building, Kern County Hall of Records, Superior Court, and Municipal Court.

Although structures representing the center of government, such as City Hall and the Court House are located there, growth has resulted in many services being moved to other places throughout the city. Also, many state and federal services are also placed in locations outside of the Civic Center.

Civic Center has also become one of Bakersfield's sport centers. Civic Center also houses the Rabobank Theater and Convention Center (formerly known as the Civic Auditorium). This is the largest theater and convention facility in the city. It is also conveniently located next to the Marriott Convention Hotel. The Rabobank Arena (formerly known as the Centennial Garden) is a large indoor multipurpose arena. The McMurtrey Aquatic Center houses a 50-meter competition swimming and diving pool. There is also the Bakersfield Ice Sports Center, an indoor ice rink used for junior and adult league hockey and recreation.

Education District

Education District is the center of education institutions that are located Downtown. Currently five institutions have a campus or a satellite campus in the district. The Education District is roughly bordered by 24th Street, Q Street, 20th Street and Chester Avenue.

Mill Creek

Mill Creek is another one of Downtown's newer districts, and is still being developed. When fully completed, Mill Creek will consist of a mixture of both low and high density residential, commercial and retail. The redevelopment area is defined to be Golden State Avenue, Union Avenue, California Avenue, and Q Street. Running through the center of Mill Creek is the Mill Creek Linear Park. This runs along the manmade Kern Island Canal, which has been redesigned to have the look of a natural river.

A major attraction in the area is the Bakersfield Museum of Art. The Beale Memorial Library, which is the headquarters for the Kern County Library System, is also located in the Mill Creek. Another important structure is the Amtrak station, which is Bakersfield's rail link to the San Joaquin Valley.

Other neighborhoods and districts
The following are neighborhoods and districts which are near to Downtown Bakersfield. Some people consider them to be a part of Downtown.

Buck Owens Boulevard

Formerly named Pierce Road, Buck Owens Boulevard was renamed in 1998 in honor of long-time Bakersfield resident and country music legend Buck Owens, who died in 2006. Buck Owens Boulevard runs north/south, parallel to Highway 99, between Rosedale Highway/24th Street in Bakersfield, and Airport Drive in Oildale. Buck Owens Boulevard is located near Beach Park and is the heart of Bakersfield's Country Music scene. The main attractions in the area are the original Bakersfield Sign (formerly located at intersection of California and Union Avenues) and the Buck Owens Crystal Palace a unique museum, store, concert hall, and restaurant.

Westchester
The Westchester neighborhood is just west of Downtown Bakersfield, although some people consider it to be part of Downtown. Westchester is bounded by the Kern River, F Street, the BNSF Railroad Yard and State Route 99 (or Oak Street). Westchester is a mostly residential neighborhood. The neighborhood is known for large shady trees and historic homes built between the 1900s and 1960s. Main points of interest include the Kern County Museum (with the Beale Memorial Clock Tower), and Sam Lynn Ballpark.

Oleander-Sunset 

The Oleander-Sunset neighborhood is located in central Bakersfield and sits on the southern end of downtown Bakersfield. The Oleander-Sunset Area consists of two neighborhoods: the Lowell Community and the Oleander Community. Oleander-Sunset is bounded by California Avenue, Union Avenue, Highway 58, and Highway 99. It contains Lowell Park, Beale Park, Albertsons, Panda Express, AM PM, (Wise Buys Drugs / Post Office), Popeyes Chicken, Chester Outlet, 7-Eleven, Taco Bell, Saigon Restaurant, Carl's Jr., Rainbow Donuts, McDonald's, Walgreens, Mount Zion Baptist Church, Starbucks, Nagi's Burgers, H&R Block,  Mr. Fast Liquor, Lowell Place Senior Community, Bakersfield High School, Vista P. Continuation High School, Rafer Johnson Community School, Emerson Junior High School, Roosevelt Elementary, McKinley Elementary, William Penn Elementary, Family Dollar, Chester Market, the Lowell Neighborhood Community Center, the Ebony Counseling Center, the Maya Cinemas and the Kern County Black Chamber of Commerce. Depending on whom one talks to, the Oleander-Sunset suburbs may refer to the Oleander area only. The Oleander neighborhood is originally bounded by: California Avenue, H Street, Highway 58, and Oak Street. Traditionally, the Lowell neighborhood Community is bounded by California Avenue, Union Avenue, Highway 58, and H Street.

Chinatown
Bakersfield's historic Chinatown was a nine square-block district bordered roughly by 20th and 23rd streets and N and K streets.

Transportation

Being located in the heart of Bakersfield, getting to and from Downtown is relatively easy. State Route 178 ends at the eastern edge of downtown, and provides a connection to the northeast. State Route 99 runs approximately a half-mile west of downtown, and provides a north/south connection to the rest of the city. Golden State Ave (State Route 204), as a freeway ends at the north edge of downtown, and provides access to the northwest.

Downtown also is the primary hub for all modes of intracity and intercity transportation, except air travel. Golden Empire Transit (GET) provides transportation to Greater Bakersfield from the downtown transit center. Kern Regional Transit provides intercity transportation from GET downtown transit center or Amtrak station. Amtrak provides rail connection to the San Joaquin Valley north of Bakersfield, and several bus routes to points west, south and east of the city (with tickets that travel by train at least once).

Although traveling to downtown is relatively easy by car, traveling through it is more difficult. Since SR 178 and Golden State Avenue (SR 204) stop at the edge of Downtown, cars must travel on surface streets to connect to additional freeways. This has created heavy traffic on major connecting arterial roads, especially on 23rd Street and 24th Street, which are one-way in each direction. This is especially a problem for cars traveling from the northeast to the southwest, since 23rd/24th St. is the most direct route between those two points.

See also
 Bakersfield, California

References

External links
 Downtown Business & Property Owners Association

Neighborhoods in Bakersfield, California
Bakersfield
Arts districts